Jalan Utama Berakas is a dual carriageway divided road in Brunei-Muara District, Brunei. The road passes through the town of Lambak Kanan in Berakas. The speed limit on the entire stretch is 80 km/h.

Junction list

{|class="wikitable" 
|-
! scope=col|Mukim
! scope=col|Location
! scope=col|KM
! scope=col|Destinations
! scope=col|Notes
|-
| rowspan=8|Berakas
| rowspan=6|Lambak Kanan
| scope="row" style="text-align: right;"|0.0
|  Muara-Tutong HighwayEast: Pekan Muara, SerasaWest: Lambak Kiri, Jerudong, Pekan Tutong, Pekan Seria, Kuala Belait
| Controlled by traffic lights
|-
| scope="row" style="text-align: right;"|-.-
| Jalan 10 UtaraEast: Lambak Kanan, Salambigar, Tanah Jambu
| Controlled by traffic lights
|-
| scope="row" style="text-align: right;"|-.-
| Northwest: Lambak Kanan Industrial Estate
| Controlled by traffic lights
|-
| scope="row" style="text-align: right;"|-.-
| East: Jalan 10Lambak Kanan Housing EstateWest: Simpang 250Lambak, Terunjing
| Controlled by traffic lights
|-
| scope="row" style="text-align: right;"|-.-
| Jalan MadangNortheast: Madang, Manggis, Sungai Tilong
| Controlled by traffic lights
|-
| scope="row" style="text-align: right;"|-.-
| Jalan Pasir BerakasNorthwest: Lambak, Terunjing
| Controlled by traffic lights
|-
| rowspan=2|Serusop
| scope="row" style="text-align: right;"|-.-
|  Sultan Hassanal Bolkiah HighwayEast: Manggis, Sungai Akar, Sungai Tilong, MuaraSouthwest: Gadong, Bandar Seri Begawan
| Controlled by traffic lights
|-
| scope="row" style="text-align: right;"|-.-
| East: Jalan MuaraSerusop, Sungai Tilong, MuaraWest:  Brunei International Airport, Terunjing Lama,  Sultan Hassanal Bolkiah HighwaySouth: Jalan Kumbang PasangGadong, Kiarong, Bandar Seri Begawan
| 4-way roundabout
|-

Roads and Highways in Brunei